Power is a studio album by Tower of Power released in 1987 on the A&M Records-distributed Cypress Records label.  It was released a year earlier with additional and/or different songs in Europe under the title T.O.P. (not to be confused with their 1993 album of the same name).  This was the only album to feature vocalist Ellis Hall, a protégé of Ray Charles, who also plays keyboards and rhythm guitar.  Hall was unique to TOP as he is thus far the only blind lead vocalist of the group.  It also marked the final departure of original guitarist Willie Fulton, and the return of original bassist Francis "Rocco" Prestia.  It also marks the debut of trumpeter Lee Thornburg, saxophonist Richard Elliot, and drummer Mick Mestek.

Track listing

US Version
SIDE ONE
"Baby's Got the Power" (Ellis Hall, Greg Adams, Billy Kent) - 3:06
"Credit" (Stephen "Doc" Kupka) - 4:06
"Some Days Were Meant for Rain" (Ellis Hall) - 4:52
"Boys Night Out" (Ellis Hall) - 5:46

SIDE TWO
"Ball and Chain" (Max Carl) - 3:18
"Through Lovers' Eyes" (Joe Curiale, Ellis Hall, Pamela Phillips Oland) - 3:39
"Count On Me" (André Pessis, Kevin Wells) - 3:24
"On the One"* (Ellis Hall) - 3:58
"Up Against Yourself"* (Ellis Hall) - 3:16

European Version as T.O.P.
SIDE ONE
"Baby's Got the Power" - 3:06
"Ball and Chain" - 3:18
"Heartbreak in the Makin'"** (Ned Doheny, Robben Ford) - 4:15
"You Ought to Be Havin' Fun" (1986 Version)** (Emilio Castillo, Stephen "Doc" Kupka, Hubert Tubbs) - 3:22
"Boys Night Out" - 5:46

SIDE TWO
"Credit" - 4:06
"Through Lovers' Eyes" - 3:39
"Some Days Were Meant for Rain" - 4:52
"Doggin' at the Cathouse"** (Emilio Castillo, Stephen "Doc" Kupka) - 3:25
"Count On Me" - 3:24

(*) US Version only 
(**) European Version only

Trivia
"Credit" was one of the songs from the Dinosaur Tracks sessions.  T.O.P. re-recorded it for this album.  Also on the European version, they re-record their 1976 song "You Ought to Be Havin' Fun" which was originally released on Ain't Nothin' Stoppin' Us Now.

Personnel 
Tower of Power
 Ellis Hall – lead vocals (1, 2, 3, 6, 7), keyboards, rhythm guitar, lead guitar (8), rhythm arrangements (8, 9)
 Willie Fulton – lead guitar, backing vocals
 Rocco Prestia – bass 
 Mick Mestek – drums
 Richard Elliot – alto saxophone, tenor saxophone, Lyricon
 Emilio Castillo – tenor saxophone, backing vocals
 Stephen "Doc" Kupka – baritone saxophone
 Greg Adams – trumpet, flugelhorn, backing vocals, horn arrangements, string arrangements 
 Lee Thornburg – trumpet, flugelhorn, backing vocals, lead vocals (5)

Additional musicians
 Stanley Benders – percussion on "On The One"
 Maxayn Lewis, Marilyn Scott and Patty Unatis – backing vocals on "On The One"

Production 
 Tim MacDonaugh – executive producer 
 Gene Vano – executive producer 
 Emilio Castillo – producer 
 Ellis Hall – co-producer 
 Ron Pendragon – engineer, mixing (1, 4-9)
 Sharon Rice – second engineer 
 Duane Seykora – second engineer 
 George Massenburg – mixing (2, 3)
 Doug Sax – mastering at The Mastering Lab (Hollywood, California)
 Linda Larson – production assistant 
 Leslie Winter – art direction, design 
 Stuart Watson – front cover photography 
 Jan Jul – back cover photography

References

1986 albums
Tower of Power albums